{{DISPLAYTITLE:C6H5NO2}}
The molecular formula C6H5NO2 (molar mass: 123.11 g/mol, exact mass: 123.0320 u) may refer to:

 Nitrobenzene
Pyridinecarboxylic acid
 Isonicotinic acid
 Niacin
 Picolinic acid
3-Hydroxyisonicotinaldehyde